Gijs Jorna (born ) is a Dutch male volleyball player. He is part of the Netherlands men's national volleyball team. He was voted best libero at the 2012 Men's European Volleyball League. On club level he played for Topvolley Precura Antwerpen in Belgium. He participated at the 2017 Men's European Volleyball Championship.

Awards
 2012 Men's European Volleyball League best libero
 CEV Olympic Qualification 2012 Best receiver
 Belgian Liga A  2015/16 Best Spiker
 Belgian Liga A  2015/16 Best Server
 Romanian Divizia A1  2017/18 Most Valuable Player
 Romanian Divizia A1  2017/18 Best Spiker
 French Cup 2019/20 Best Spiker
 French Cup 2019/20 Best Server

References

External links
 profile at FIVB.org

1989 births
Living people
Dutch men's volleyball players
People from Enkhuizen
Dutch expatriate sportspeople in France
Expatriate volleyball players in France
Dutch expatriate sportspeople in Romania
Expatriate volleyball players in Romania
Dutch expatriate sportspeople in Belgium
Dutch expatriate sportspeople in Greece
Expatriate volleyball players in Belgium
Expatriate volleyball players in Greece
Sportspeople from North Holland
Liberos
21st-century Dutch people